Conchylodes is a genus of snout moths in the family Crambidae. The genus comprises 21 species and is placed in the tribe Udeini.

Recently, the monotypic genus Nonazochis, described by Hans Georg Amsel in 1956, was synonymized with Conchylodes. This led to the transfer of its type species, Azochis graphialis, to Conchylodes as Conchylodes graphialis.

Species
Conchylodes aquaticalis (Guenée, 1854)
Conchylodes arcifera Hampson, 1912
Conchylodes bryophilalis Hampson, 1899
Conchylodes concinnalis Hampson, 1899
Conchylodes diphteralis (Geyer in Hübner, 1832)
Conchylodes erinalis (Walker, 1859)
Conchylodes gammaphora Hampson, 1912
Conchylodes graphialis (Schaus, 1912)
Conchylodes hebraealis Guenée, 1854
Conchylodes hedonialis (Walker, 1859)
Conchylodes intricata Hampson, 1912
Conchylodes nissenalis (Schaus, 1924)
Conchylodes nolckenialis (Snellen, 1875)
Conchylodes octonalis (Zeller, 1873)
Conchylodes ovulalis (Guenée, 1854)
Conchylodes platinalis (Guenée, 1854)
Conchylodes salamisalis Druce, 1895
Conchylodes stictiperalis Hampson, 1912
Conchylodes terminipuncta Hampson, 1912
Conchylodes vincentalis Schaus, 1924
Conchylodes zebra (Sepp, 1850)

References

Spilomelinae
Crambidae genera
Taxa named by Achille Guenée